Special Events Television Network (SETN) is the name of a defunct syndicated television package that broadcast tape delayed NASCAR races from 1984 to 1988. SETN aired races (typically from Martinsville and Pocono as well as from Rockingham, Charlotte, Richmond and Daytona for good measure) that didn't have live television deals at the time. The broadcasts were aired on tape delay because certain promoters still feared that live telecasts would hurt their gate. SETN also sold VHS videos of some races it carried, with additional footage not seen on TV. In addition to its stock car racing, the network produced twelve telecasts of International Hot Rod Association events.

SETN was headed by Jim Wiglesworth (father of Survivor: Borneo runner up Kelly Wiglesworth) out of Greensboro, North Carolina. SETN was underfunded, and since profits were slim, so were rights fees. Ultimately, the growing popularity of racing on ESPN as well as the overall lack of cash flow drove them out of the business. SETN ceased operations in June 1988; the first Pocono race that year was seen on the Financial News Network's Score weekend sports service, and Martinsville, the last holdout against live television rights, signed an ESPN deal for its fall race.

After SETN folded, one Pocono race a year was produced by Jim Wiglesworth on pay-per-view for Viewer's Choice (now In Demand) from 1988 to 1990. They were not a huge success, as fans were reluctant to pay for what they could see last week for free. The Viewer's Choice shows were noteworthy in that they premiered viewer phone-in questions during the races.

Commentators

Lap-by-lap
Dave Despain
Eli Gold
Mike Joy

Color commentary
Dick Berggren 
Benny Parsons
Ron Bouchard
Phil Parsons
Jerry Punch

Pit road
Bob Heiss
Pat Patterson

Stations

References

External links
Google Search - Timeline
Nascar Racing on TV in the 80s--SETN 

NASCAR on television
Defunct television networks in the United States
Television channels and stations established in 1984
1984 establishments in the United States
Television channels and stations disestablished in 1988
1988 disestablishments in the United States